Wentworth was an electoral district of the Legislative Assembly of the Parliament of the Province of Canada, in Canada West (now Ontario). It was created in 1841, upon the establishment of the Province of Canada by the union of Upper Canada and Lower Canada. Wentworth was represented by one member in the Legislative Assembly.  In 1853, it was split into two ridings, Wentworth North and Wentworth South.

Boundaries 

Wentworth electoral district was based on Wentworth county (now part of the city of Hamilton), at the northwestern end of Lake Ontario.  Hamilton and Burlington were the two major centres.

The Union Act, 1840 merged the two provinces of Upper Canada and Lower Canada into the Province of Canada, with a single Parliament.  The separate parliaments of Lower Canada and Upper Canada were abolished.Union Act, 1840, 3 & 4 Vict. (UK), c. 35, s. 2.  The Union Act provided that the pre-existing electoral boundaries of Upper Canada would continue to be used in the new Parliament, unless altered by the Union Act itself.

Wentworth county had been an electoral district in the Legislative Assembly of Upper Canada, and its boundaries were not altered by the Union Act. Those boundaries had originally been set by statute in 1816, when Wentworth county was created as a separate county in the new district of Gore, carved out of the existing Niagara and Home districts.  Wentworth country was defined to include:

Since Wentworth was not changed by the Union Act, those boundaries continued to be used for the new electoral district. Wentworth was represented by one member in the Legislative Assembly.

Members of the Legislative Assembly 

The following were the members for Wentworth.

Abolition 

Wentworth electoral district was abolished in 1853, when there was a major redistribution of seats in the Legislative Assembly.  Wentworth was split into two new ridings, Wentworth North and Wentworth South. The abolition took effect in the general election of 1854.

References 

Electoral districts of Canada West